Newton Township is one of the twenty-five townships of Muskingum County, Ohio, United States.  The 2000 census found 5,402 people in the township, 5,186 of whom lived in the unincorporated portions of the township.

Geography
Located on the western edge of the county, it borders the following townships:
Springfield Township - north
Brush Creek Township - east
Clay Township - southeast
Harrison Township, Perry County - south
Clayton Township, Perry County - southwest
Madison Township, Perry County - west
Hopewell Township - northwest

The village of Fultonham is located in western Newton Township, and the unincorporated communities of East Fultonham and White Cottage are both located near the center of the township.  East Fultonham lies farther southwest than White Cottage.

Name and history
It is one of five Newton Townships statewide.

In 1833, Newton Township contained three churches, two or three salt works, seven saw mills, six flouring mills, and one physician.

Government
The township is governed by a three-member board of trustees, who are elected in November of odd-numbered years to a four-year term beginning on the following January 1. Two are elected in the year after the presidential election and one is elected in the year before it. There is also an elected township fiscal officer, who serves a four-year term beginning on April 1 of the year after the election, which is held in November of the year before the presidential election. Vacancies in the fiscal officership or on the board of trustees are filled by the remaining trustees.

References

External links
County website

Townships in Muskingum County, Ohio
Townships in Ohio